Esenyurt is a district of the Istanbul Province and is a part of the metropolitan municipality of Istanbul. Located in the European side of Istanbul, Esenyurt borders with Avcılar and Lake Küçükçekmece on the east, Büyükçekmece on the west, Başakşehir, Arnavutköy and TEM road on the north and Beylikdüzü and E-5 motorway on the south.
The district covers an area of 2.770 hectares and has its own municipality since 1989.

With the construction boom of large residential complexes in the area in the past few years, Esenyurt benefited from a major development. It now has four cultural centres, which are Esenyurt Cultural Centre, Saadetdere Cultural Centre, Yenikent Cultural Centre and Yunus Balta Cultural Centre. Four parks built in Esenyurt  (Recep Tayyip Erdoğan Park, Şehitler Park, Gaziler Park and Kadir Topbaş Park) are also situated among the complexes.

History 
The district is mainly built on the land owned by Ekrem Ömer Paşa in the 19th century. The name Esenyurt drives from one of the land owners Eşkinoz. The area received migration from Romania and Bulgaria between 1920 and 1938, and had more recent migration mainly from Ardahan and Kars, as well as Erzurum and Artvin. In 1990s, Kurds evicted from their villages during the armed conflict between Turkey and the Kurdistan Workers' Party (PKK) were settled in the district.

Esenyurt today 
Esenyurt is a popular residential area due to the brand new properties and affordable property prices compared with Istanbul centre. Esenyurt is home to the Istanbul Esenyurt University, while being very close to Beykent University, Istanbul Arel University, Istanbul University and Istanbul Gelişim University. TUYAP Exhibition and Conference Centre is only 5km away from Esenyurt centre, while it is 26km away from the Istanbul Atatürk Airport.
Shopping facilities are mainly gathered around shopping centres rather than individual shops along the streets. Esenyurt has three shopping centres, which are Eskule Shopping Centre, Torium Shopping Centre, City Center Shopping Centre and Akbatı AVM.

Transportation

Public buses to/from Esenyurt
 142E Esenyurt Incirtepe - Aksaray
 142K Esenyurt Kiptaş 4. Etap- 5. Etap- Avcılar
 142T Esenyurt Public Hospital - TUYAP Exhibition and Conference Centre
 429 Kıraç - Yenibosna Metro

Metrobus lines to/from Esenyurt
 34B Beylikdüzü - Avcılar
 34BZ Beylikdüzü - Zincirlikuyu (night service)
 34C Beylikdüzü - Cevizlibağ
 34G Beylikdüzü - Söğütlüçeşme (night service)

Government 
The mayor is Kemal Deniz Bozkurt of the center-left Republican People's Party (CHP).

Education
 Beykent University Hadımköy Campus

Sport
Süper Lig football club İstanbulspor plays their home matches at Esenyurt Necmi Kadıoğlu Stadium.

Recreation

In 2016, the municipality leased the Danamandıra Nature Park in Silivri district for 49 years in order to provide recreation area for the residents of the crowded district.

Climate 
Esenyurt experiences a relatively cool Mediterranean climate (Csa/Cs) according to both Köppen and Trewartha climate classifications, with cool winters and warm to hot summers. 

Esenyurt is almost a degree colder than Bakırköy, this is despite the two districts' close proximity. Nevertheless, it does conform to the general pattern of lower precipitation values, common in southern Istanbul. It is in USDA hardiness zone 9a and AHS heat zone 4.

References

External links
Esenyurt – the new city center with style
Esenyurt Istanbul 
Municipality of Esenyurt 

 
Districts of Istanbul Province